Antarjali Jatra, also known as Antarjali Yatra, is a 1987 film directed by Kolkata based Indian film director Goutam Ghose based on a novel, Mahayatra by Kamal Kumar Majumdar. It documents the institution of Kulin Brahmin polygamy in nineteenth century Bengal. The film got National Film Award for Best Feature Film in Bengali in 1988. It was screened in the Un Certain Regard section the 1988 Cannes Film Festival.

Cast
 Shatrughan Sinha as Baiju
 Vasant Choudhury as Yashobati's Father
 Promode Ganguly as Seetaram
 Rabi Ghosh as Astrologer
 Shampa Ghosh as Yashobati
 Mohan Agashe

Awards

The film got National Film Award for Best Feature Film in Bengali in 1988. 

It was screened in the Un Certain Regard section the 1988 Cannes Film Festival and Grand Prix at Tashkent Film Festival 1988.

References

External links

1987 films
Bengali-language Indian films
Films directed by Goutam Ghose
Films based on Indian novels
Films about polygamy
Films set in the 19th century
Films set in Bengal
Polygamy in fiction
History of India on film
Best Bengali Feature Film National Film Award winners
1980s Bengali-language films
National Film Development Corporation of India films